Iowa City Community School District (ICCSD) is the public school district that serves the Iowa City, Iowa area. Over 14,000 students in kindergarten through 12th grade attend 21 elementary schools, three junior high schools, three comprehensive high schools, and one alternative school for ninth through twelfth graders. The school district employs over 2,200 people. It is the fifth largest school district in the state of Iowa and the second largest employer in the Iowa City area.

Historic schools 

Henry Sabin Elementary School in Iowa City, Iowa was located at 509 South Dubuque Street.  The building housed an alternative high school, but was originally known as the First Ward School.  The school was named for the Iowa educator Henry Sabin. The school closed as an elementary school circa 1979.  It was known throughout the 1970s for its alternative teaching methods, including open classrooms and discussions about drug abuse and sexuality.  Above the kindergarten level, classes were paired—first and second grade, third and fourth grade, and fifth and sixth grade. Ana Mendieta, an art teacher at the school for a few years in the mid-1970s, would achieve some renown as an artist. The building was torn down in 2015.

List of schools

Elementary schools 
Alexander Elementary
Borlaug Elementary
Coralville Central Elementary
Garner Elementary
Grant Elementary
Hills Elementary
Hoover Elementary
Horn Elementary
Kirkwood Elementary
Lemme Elementary
Lincoln Elementary
Longfellow Elementary
Lucas Elementary
Mann Elementary
Penn Elementary
Shimek Elementary
Twain Elementary
Van Allen Elementary
Weber Elementary
Wickham Elementary
Grant Wood Elementary

Junior high schools 
North Central Junior High
Northwest Junior High
South East Junior High

High schools 
City High
West High
Liberty High School

Alternative school 
Elizabeth Tate High School

Enrollment

See also
List of school districts in Iowa

References 

http://iowacityschools.org/
http://www.gazetteonline.com/apps/pbcs.dll/article?AID=/20070213/NEWS/70213037/1001/NEWS
http://www.press-citizen.com/apps/pbcs.dll/article?AID=/20071208/NEWS01/712080350/1079

School districts in Iowa
Education in Johnson County, Iowa
Iowa City, Iowa